Tom Okker and Marty Riessen were the defending champions.

Okker and Riessen successfully defended their title, defeating Stan Smith and Erik van Dillen 8–6, 4–6, 10–8 in the final.

Seeds

Draw

Finals

Top half

Bottom half

External links
 Draw

1971 Queen's Club Championships